This is a list of people executed in the United States in 2019. A total of twenty-two people, all male, were executed in the United States in 2019, twenty by lethal injection and two, in Tennessee, by electrocution.

List of people executed in the United States in 2019

Demographics

Executions in recent years

See also
 List of death row inmates in the United States
 List of exonerated death row inmates#2019
 List of juveniles executed in the United States since 1976
 List of most recent executions by jurisdiction
 List of people scheduled to be executed in the United States
 List of women executed in the United States since 1976

References

List of people executed in the United States
Executions
People executed in the United States
2019
Male murderers